Noblella lynchi is a species of frog in the family Strabomantidae. It is endemic to Peru and only known from its type locality on the eastern slope of Abra Chanchillo, near Balsas, Amazonas Region.

Noblella lynchi is known from disturbed cloud forest. It is a rare species: a search effort of 30 person days uncovered only four individuals.

References

lynchi
Amphibians of the Andes
Amphibians of Peru
Endemic fauna of Peru
Taxonomy articles created by Polbot
Amphibians described in 1991